Edvīns Zāģeris (born 10 May 1943) is a Latvian hurdler. He competed in the men's 400 metres hurdles at the 1964 Summer Olympics, representing the Soviet Union.

References

1943 births
Living people
Athletes (track and field) at the 1964 Summer Olympics
Latvian male hurdlers
Soviet male hurdlers
Olympic athletes of the Soviet Union
Place of birth missing (living people)